Francisco Enrique Castillo Sáez (born 2 September 1985) is a former Chilean footballer. 

His last club was Lota Schwager.

References
 
 

1985 births
Living people
Chilean footballers
Lota Schwager footballers
C.D. Huachipato footballers
Curicó Unido footballers
Unión Española footballers
Deportes Concepción (Chile) footballers
Naval de Talcahuano footballers
Malleco Unido footballers
Chilean Primera División players
Primera B de Chile players
Association football midfielders
People from Talcahuano